The Coalcomán River is a river of Michoacán state, in western−central Mexico.

Geography
Its watershed is in the Sierra Madre del Sur mountain range. Its river mouth is on the Pacific Coast of Mexico.

See also
Coalcomán de Vázquez Pallares — municipality on the river.
List of rivers of Mexico

References

Utexas.edu: "Atlas of Mexico" − Map of the rivers and river basins of Mexico

Rivers of Michoacán
Pacific Coast of Mexico
Sierra Madre del Sur